Natural philosophy or philosophy of nature (from Latin philosophia naturalis) is the philosophical study of physics, that is, nature and the physical universe.  It was dominant before the development of modern science.

From the ancient world (at least since Aristotle) until the 19th century, natural philosophy was the common term for the study of physics (nature), a broad term that included botany, zoology, anthropology, and chemistry as well as what we now call physics.  It was in the 19th century that the concept of science received its modern shape, with different subjects within science emerging, such as astronomy, biology, and physics. Institutions and communities devoted to science were founded. Isaac Newton's book Philosophiæ Naturalis Principia Mathematica (1687) (English: Mathematical Principles of Natural Philosophy) reflects the use of the term natural philosophy in the 17th century. Even in the 19th century, the work that helped define much of modern physics bore the title Treatise on Natural Philosophy (1867).

In the German tradition, Naturphilosophie (philosophy of nature) persisted into the 18th and 19th centuries as an attempt to achieve a speculative unity of nature and spirit, after rejecting the scholastic tradition and replacing Aristotelian metaphysics, along with those of the dogmatic churchmen, with Kantian rationalism.  Some of the greatest names in German philosophy are associated with this movement, including Goethe, Hegel, and Schelling. Naturphilosophie was associated with Romanticism and a view that regarded the natural world as a kind of giant organism, as opposed to the philosophical approach of figures such as John Locke and others espousing a more mechanical philosophy of the world, regarding it as being like a machine.

Origin and evolution of the term
The term natural philosophy preceded current usage of natural science (i.e. empirical science). Empirical science historically developed out of philosophy or, more specifically, natural philosophy. Natural philosophy was distinguished from the other precursor of modern science, natural history, in that natural philosophy involved reasoning and explanations about nature (and after Galileo, quantitative reasoning), whereas natural history was essentially qualitative and descriptive.

In the 14th and 15th centuries, natural philosophy was one of many branches of philosophy, but was not a specialized field of study. The first person appointed as a specialist in Natural Philosophy per se was Jacopo Zabarella, at the University of Padua in 1577.

Modern meanings of the terms science and scientists date only to the 19th century. Before that, science was a synonym for knowledge or study, in keeping with its Latin origin. The term gained its modern meaning when experimental science and the scientific method became a specialized branch of study apart from natural philosophy.

From the mid-19th century, when it became increasingly unusual for scientists to contribute to both physics and chemistry, "natural philosophy" came to mean just physics, and the word is still used in that sense in degree titles at the University of Oxford and University of Aberdeen. In general, chairs of Natural Philosophy established long ago at the oldest universities are nowadays occupied mainly by physics professors. Isaac Newton's book Philosophiae Naturalis Principia Mathematica (1687), whose title translates to "Mathematical Principles of Natural Philosophy", reflects the then-current use of the words "natural philosophy", akin to "systematic study of nature". Even in the 19th century, a treatise by Lord Kelvin and Peter Guthrie Tait, which helped define much of modern physics, was titled Treatise on Natural Philosophy (1867).

Greek philosophers defined it as the combination of beings living in the universe, ignoring things made by humans. The other definition refers to human nature.

Scope
In Plato's earliest known dialogue, Charmides distinguishes between science or bodies of knowledge that produce a physical result, and those that do not.  Natural philosophy has been categorized as a theoretical rather than a practical branch of philosophy (like ethics).  Sciences that guide arts and draw on the philosophical knowledge of nature may produce practical results, but these subsidiary sciences (e.g., architecture or medicine) go beyond natural philosophy.

The study of natural philosophy seeks to explore the cosmos by any means necessary to understand the universe.  Some ideas presuppose that change is a reality.  Although this may seem obvious, there have been some philosophers who have denied the concept of metamorphosis, such as Plato's predecessor Parmenides and later Greek philosopher Sextus Empiricus, and perhaps some Eastern philosophers. George Santayana, in his Scepticism and Animal Faith, attempted to show that the reality of change cannot be proven.  If his reasoning is sound, it follows that to be a physicist, one must restrain one's skepticism enough to trust one's senses, or else rely on anti-realism.

René Descartes' metaphysical system of mind–body dualism describes two kinds of substance: matter and mind. According to this system, everything that is "matter" is deterministic and natural—and so belongs to natural philosophy—and everything that is "mind" is volitional and non-natural, and falls outside the domain of philosophy of nature.

Branches and subject matter
Major branches of natural philosophy include astronomy and cosmology, the study of nature on the grand scale; etiology, the study of (intrinsic and sometimes extrinsic) causes; the study of chance, probability and randomness; the study of elements; the study of the infinite and the unlimited (virtual or actual); the study of matter; mechanics, the study of translation of motion and change; the study of nature or the various sources of actions; the study of natural qualities; the study of physical quantities; the study of relations between physical entities; and the philosophy of space and time. (Adler, 1993)

History 

Humankind's mental engagement with nature certainly predates civilization and the record of history. Philosophical, and specifically non-religious thought about the natural world, goes back to ancient Greece. These lines of thought began before Socrates, who turned from his philosophical studies from speculations about nature to a consideration of man, viz., political philosophy. The thought of early philosophers such as Parmenides, Heraclitus, and Democritus centered on the natural world. In addition, three Presocratic philosophers who lived in the Ionian town of Miletus (hence the Milesian School of philosophy), Thales, Anaximander, and Anaximenes, attempted to explain natural phenomena without recourse to  creation myths involving the Greek gods. They were called the physikoi ("natural philosophers") or, as Aristotle referred to them, the physiologoi. Plato followed Socrates in concentrating on man. It was Plato's student, Aristotle, who, in basing his thought on the natural world, returned empiricism to its primary place, while leaving room in the world for man. Martin Heidegger observes that Aristotle was the originator of conception of nature that prevailed in the Middle Ages into the modern era:

Aristotle surveyed the thought of his predecessors and conceived of nature in a way that charted a middle course between their excesses.

"The world we inhabit is an orderly one, in which things generally behave in predictable ways, Aristotle argued, because every natural object has a "nature"—an attribute (associated primarily with form) that makes the object behave in its customary fashion..." Aristotle recommended four causes as appropriate for the business of the natural philosopher, or physicist, “and if he refers his problems back to all of them, he will assign the ‘why’ in the way proper to his science—the matter, the form, the mover, [and] ‘that for the sake of which’”. While the vagaries of the material cause are subject to circumstance, the formal, efficient and final cause often coincide because in natural kinds, the mature form and final cause are one and the same. The capacity to mature into a specimen of one's kind is directly acquired from “the primary source of motion”, i.e., from one's father, whose seed (sperma) conveys the essential nature (common to the species), as a hypothetical ratio.

 Material cause   An object's motion will behave in different ways depending on the [substance/essence] from which it is made. (Compare clay, steel, etc.)
 Formal cause     An object's motion will behave in different ways depending on its material arrangement. (Compare a clay sphere, clay block, etc.)
 Efficient cause  That which caused the object to come into being; an "agent of change" or an "agent of movement". 
 Final cause      The reason that caused the object to be brought into existence. 

From the late Middle Ages into the modern era, the tendency has been to narrow "science" to the consideration of efficient or agency-based causes of a particular kind:

In ancient Greece
Early Greek philosophers studied motion and the cosmos. Figures like Hesiod regarded the natural world as offspring of the gods, whereas others like Leucippus and Democritus regarded the world as lifeless atoms in a vortex. Anaximander deduced that eclipses happen because of apertures in rings of celestial fire. Heraclitus believed that the heavenly bodies were made of fire that were contained within bowls. He thought that eclipses happen when the bowl turned away from the earth. Anaximenes is believed to have stated that an underlying element was air, and by manipulating air someone could change its thickness to create fire, water, dirt, and stones. Empedocles identified the elements that make up the world, which he termed the roots of all things, as fire, air, earth, and water. Parmenides argued that all change is a logical impossibility. He gives the example that nothing can go from nonexistence to existence. Plato argues that the world is an imperfect replica of an idea that a divine craftsman once held. He also believed that the only way to truly know something was through reason and logic not the study of the object itself, but that changeable matter is a viable course of study.

Aristotle's philosophy of nature

"An acorn is potentially, but not actually, an oak tree. In becoming an oak tree, it becomes actually what it originally was only potentially. This change thus involves passage from potentiality to actuality — not from non-being to being but from one kind or degree to being another"

Aristotle held many important beliefs that started a convergence of thought for natural philosophy. Aristotle believed that attributes of objects belong to the objects themselves, and share traits with other objects that fit them into a category. He uses the example of dogs to press this point. An individual dog may have very specific attributes (ex. one dog can be black and another brown) but also very general ones that classify it as a dog (ex. four-legged). This philosophy can be applied to many other objects as well. This idea is different than that of Plato, with whom Aristotle had a direct association. Aristotle argued that objects have properties "form" and something that is not part of its properties "matter" that defines the object. The form cannot be separated from the matter. Given the example that you can not separate properties and matter since this is impossible, you cannot collect properties in a pile and matter in another.

Aristotle believed that change was a natural occurrence. He used his philosophy of form and matter to argue that when something changes you change its properties without changing its matter. This change occurs by replacing certain properties with other properties. Since this change is always an intentional alteration whether by forced means or by natural ones, change is a controllable order of qualities. He argues that this happens through three categories of being: non-being, potential being, and actual being. Through these three states the process of changing an object never truly destroys an object's forms during this transition state but rather just blurs the reality between the two states. An example of this could be changing an object from red to blue with a transitional purple phase.

Medieval philosophy of motion
Medieval thoughts on motion involved much of Aristotle's works Physics and Metaphysics. The issue that medieval philosophers had with motion was the inconsistency found between book 3 of Physics and book 5 of Metaphysics. Aristotle claimed in book 3 of Physics that motion can be categorized by substance, quantity, quality, and place. where in book 5 of Metaphysics he stated that motion is a magnitude of quantity. This disputation led to some important questions to natural philosophers: Which category/categories does motion fit into? Is motion the same thing as a terminus? Is motion separate from real things? These questions asked by medieval philosophers tried to classify motion.

William of Ockham gives a good concept of motion for many people in the Middle Ages. There is an issue with the vocabulary behind motion that makes people think that there is a correlation between nouns and the qualities that make nouns. Ockham states that this distinction is what will allow people to understand motion, that motion is a property of mobiles, locations, and forms and that is all that is required to define what motion is. A famous example of this is Occam's razor, which simplifies vague statements by cutting them into more descriptive examples. "Every motion derives from an agent." becomes "each thing that is moved, is moved by an agent" this makes motion a more personal quality referring to individual objects that are moved.

Natural philosophy in the early modern period

The scientific method has ancient precedents, and Galileo exemplifies a mathematical understanding of nature, which is a hallmark of modern natural scientists. Galileo proposed that objects falling regardless of their mass would fall at the same rate, as long as the medium they fall in is identical. The 19th-century distinction of a scientific enterprise apart from traditional natural philosophy has its roots in prior centuries. Proposals for a more "inquisitive" and practical approach to the study of nature are notable in Francis Bacon, whose ardent convictions did much to popularize his insightful Baconian method. The Baconian method is employed throughout Thomas Browne's encyclopaedia Pseudodoxia Epidemica (1646–1672), which debunks a wide-range of common fallacies through empirical investigation of nature.   The late-17th-century natural philosopher Robert Boyle wrote a seminal work on the distinction between physics and metaphysics called, A Free Enquiry into the Vulgarly Received Notion of Nature, as well as The Skeptical Chymist, after which the modern science of chemistry is named, (as distinct from proto-scientific studies of alchemy). These works of natural philosophy are representative of a departure from the medieval scholasticism taught in European universities, and anticipate in many ways, the developments that would lead to science as practiced in the modern sense. As Bacon would say, "vexing nature" to reveal "her" secrets, (scientific experimentation), rather than a mere reliance on largely historical, even anecdotal, observations of empirical phenomena, would come to be regarded as a defining characteristic of modern science, if not the very key to its success. Boyle's biographers, in their emphasis that he laid the foundations of modern chemistry, neglect how steadily he clung to the scholastic sciences in theory, practice and doctrine. However, he meticulously recorded observational detail on practical research, and subsequently advocated not only this practice, but its publication, both for successful and unsuccessful experiments, so as to validate individual claims by replication.

Natural philosophers of the late 17th or early 18th century were sometimes insultingly described as 'projectors'. A projector was an entrepreneur who invited people to invest in his invention but – as the caricature went – could not be trusted, usually because his device was impractical. Jonathan Swift satirized natural philosophers of the Royal Society as 'the academy of projectors' in his novel Gulliver's Travels. Historians of science have argued that natural philosophers and the so-called projectors sometimes overlapped in their methods and aims.

Current work in the philosophy of science and nature
In the middle of the 20th century, Ernst Mayr's discussions on the teleology of nature brought up issues that were dealt with previously by Aristotle (regarding final cause) and Kant (regarding reflective judgment).

Especially since the mid-20th-century European crisis, some thinkers argued the importance of looking at nature from a broad philosophical perspective, rather than what they considered a narrowly positivist approach relying implicitly on a hidden, unexamined philosophy.  One line of thought grows from the Aristotelian tradition, especially as developed by Thomas Aquinas. Another line springs from Edmund Husserl, especially as expressed in The Crisis of European Sciences. Students of his such as Jacob Klein and Hans Jonas more fully developed his themes. Last, but not least, there is the process philosophy inspired by Alfred North Whitehead's works.

Among living scholars, Brian David Ellis, Nancy Cartwright, David Oderberg, and John Dupré are some of the more prominent thinkers who can arguably be classed as generally adopting a more open approach to the natural world. Ellis (2002) observes the rise of a "New Essentialism." David Oderberg (2007) takes issue with other philosophers, including Ellis to a degree, who claim to be essentialists. He revives and defends the Thomistic-Aristotelian tradition from modern attempts to flatten nature to the limp subject of the experimental method. In his In Praise of Natural Philosophy: A Revolution for Thought and Life (2017), Nicholas Maxwell argues that we need to reform philosophy and put science and philosophy back together again to create a modern version of natural philosophy.

See also

References

Further reading

 E.A. Burtt, Metaphysical Foundations of Modern Science (Garden City, NY: Doubleday and Company, 1954).
Philip Kitcher, Science, Truth, and Democracy. Oxford Studies in Philosophy of Science. Oxford; New York: Oxford University Press, 2001.  LCCN:2001036144 
Bertrand Russell, A History of Western Philosophy and Its Connection with Political and Social Circumstances from the Earliest Times to the Present Day (1945) Simon & Schuster, 1972.

David Snoke, Natural Philosophy: A Survey of Physics and Western Thought.  Access Research Network, 2003. .Natural Philosophy: A Survey of Physics and Western Thought Welcome to The Old Schoolhouse® Magazine
Nancy R. Pearcey and Charles B. Thaxton, The Soul of Science: Christian Faith and Natural Philosophy (Crossway Books, 1994).
Alfred N. Whitehead, Process and Reality, The Macmillan Company, 1929.
René Thom, Modèles mathématiques de la morphogenèse, Christian Bourgois, 1980.
Claude Paul Bruter, Topologie et perception, Maloine, 3 vols. 1974/1976/1986.
Jean Largeault, Principes classiques d'interprétation de la nature, Vrin, 1988.
Moritz Schlick, Philosophy of Nature, Philosophical Library, New York, 1949.
Andrew G. Van Melsen, The Philosophy of Nature, Duquesne University, Pittsburgh 1954.
Miguel Espinoza, La matière éternelle et ses harmonies éphémères, L’Harmattan, Paris, 2017.

External links

"Aristotle's Natural Philosophy", Stanford Encyclopedia of Philosophy
Institute for the Study of Nature
 "A Bigger Physics," a talk at MIT by Michael Augros
Other articles

 
History of philosophy
History of science